Leonard Rosser Akin (April 8, 1916 – March 5, 1987) was a guard in the National Football League (NFL). He was drafted in the seventh round of the 1940 NFL Draft by the Chicago Bears and later played with the team during the 1942 NFL season. Prior to playing with the Bears he had also played with the Milwaukee Chiefs of the American Football League.

References

1916 births
1987 deaths
American football guards
Bainbridge Commodores football players
Baylor Bears football players
Chicago Bears players
Milwaukee Chiefs (AFL) players
People from McKinney, Texas
Sportspeople from the Dallas–Fort Worth metroplex
Players of American football from Texas